Chianeh (also Romanized as Chīāneh and Cheyānah) is a village in Piran Rural District, in the Central District of Piranshahr County, West Azerbaijan Province, Iran. At the 2006 census, its population was 390, in 63 families.

References 

Populated places in Piranshahr County